Breeching (also britching) may refer to:
Breeching (boys), putting boys in breeches or trousers for the first time
Breeching (tack), a strap around the haunches of a draft, pack or riding animal
Breeching, the flue of a boiler

See also
Breech (disambiguation)
False breeching (disambiguation)
Breach (disambiguation)